Charles Swinfen Eady, 1st Baron Swinfen,  (31 July 1851 – 15 November 1919) was a British lawyer and judge.

Biography
Eady was the son of George John Eady of Chertsey, Surrey, and his wife Laura Maria Smith, daughter of Richard Smith. He was educated privately and at the University of London, and was admitted a solicitor in 1874.

In 1879 Eady was called to the Bar, Inner Temple. He built a successful legal practice and became a Queen's Counsel in 1893. He was appointed a Judge of the High Court of Justice (Chancery Division) in November 1901, and knighted the following month. He held this office until 1913, when he was appointed a Lord Justice of Appeal, serving until 1918. The latter year he succeeded Lord Cozens-Hardy as Master of the Rolls. However, Eady's health soon began to decline and he resigned in the autumn of 1919. He had been admitted to the Privy Council in 1913 and on 1 November 1919 was raised to the peerage as Baron Swinfen, of Chertsey in the County of Surrey.

Mr Justice Swinfen Eady gave a key judgment in 1903 which protected Kodak's trademarks from infringement from competitors, which the British Journal of Photography described as the most important for photography to have been heard since Talbot v. Laroche in 1854.  He also gave the judgment in Percival v Wright [1902] 2 Ch 401, a key decision on directors' duties.

Lord Swinfen married, in 1894, Blanche Maude Lee, daughter of Sydney Williams Lee. They had one son and two daughters.

He died, aged sixty-eight, at 33 Hyde Park Gardens, London, on 15 November 1919, only two weeks after his elevation to the peerage.  He was cremated at Golders Green Crematorium. He was succeeded in the barony by his only son Charles.

Arms

References

1851 births
1919 deaths
1
Alumni of the University of London
Masters of the Rolls
Members of the Inner Temple
English King's Counsel
Chancery Division judges
Knights Bachelor
Members of the Privy Council of the United Kingdom
British solicitors
19th-century English lawyers
Barons created by George V